Xu Zhen (Chinese 徐震), born in 1977 in Shanghai, China, is a multimedia artist. Xu Zhen's body of work, which includes photography, installation art and video, entails theatrical humor and social critique. His projects are informed by performance and conceptual art. Xu's work focuses on human sensitivity and dramatizes the humdrum of urban living.

Biography

Xu Zhen's earlier representative individual works include the video, Rainbow (1998), where an abstracted hand beats a man 's back until it burns red. Rainbow made Zhen the youngest Chinese artist to have participated in the main thematic exhibition of the Venice Biennale. The video, Shouting (1998), captures the fright and bewilderment of faces turned backwards on the crowded streets of Shanghai, after Xu Zhen suddenly bursts out screaming. The installation ShanghART Supermarket (2007) recreates a convenience store on-site: the shelves are crammed full of empty products, while the items, sold at their ordinarily marked prices, only have the external shells of their packaging.

His recent pieces survey ancient and new art while fusing Chinese and Western cultures into large scale installations or into new art forms. European Thousand-Hand Classical Sculpture (2014) assembles 19 different Western classical sculptures of various forms; borrowing from the shape of the Thousand-Hand Guanyin (Bodhisattva) in Buddhist iconography. Physique of Consciousness (2011) is a video which comprises movements derived from dance, gymnastics, spiritual and cultural rituals.

Curation 
Xu Zhen's curatorial experiments and engagement with an alternative art space, BizArt (closed in 2010), complement and extend practice. Aside from being an artist, Xu Zhen organizes various art activities and co-curates with other artists. Major exhibitions in Shanghai include Art For Sale (1999); Fan Mingzhen & Fan Mingzhu (2002); Dial 62761232-Courier Exhibition (2004); 38 Solo Exhibitions (2006); The Real Thing: Contemporary from Art China (2007), Tate Liverpool; Bourgeoisified Proletariat (2009); and My Communism – Poster Exhibition (2011). He was also one of the creators of the online contemporary art forum, Art-Ba-Ba, in 2006.

Museum and Biennale Exhibition
Xu Zhen has exhibited internationally at museums and biennales, such as, Venice Biennale (2001, 2005), Lyon Biennial (2013), Asia Pacific Triennial (2012), Guangzhou Triennial (2012), The Museum of Modern Art (New York, 2004), ICP (2004), Mori Art Museum (2005), PS1 (2006), Tate Liverpool (2007) etc. Recent exhibitions include Corporate-Xu Zhen (Produced by MadeIn Company), Kunsthaus Graz (Graz, Austria, 2015), Xu Zhen Solo Exhibition, Long Museum (Shanghai, China, 2015), Xu Zhen-Produced by MadeIn Company, Ullens Center for Contemporary Art (Beijing, China, 2014), 14 Rooms, Fondation Beyeler (Basel, Switzerland, 2014), Art of Change (Hayward Gallery, London, 2012), 11 Rooms (Manchester International Festival, Manchester City Galleries, 2011), 15 Rooms, Long Museum (Shanghai, China, 2015), Corporate, Graz Kunsthaus, (Graz, Austria, 2015), Bentu: Chinese Artists in a Time of Turbulence and Transformation, and Fondation Louis Vuitton (Paris, France, 2016)  etc.

Xu Zhen won the prize for ‘Best Artist’ at the China Contemporary Art Award in 2004 and ‘Best Artist of the Year’ at the AAC Award in 2014.

His work has been collected by many institutions and private collections worldwide including the Fondation Louis Vuitton, Paris, the Centre Pompidou, Paris, the Daimler Collection (Berlin, Germany), The White Rabbit Collection (Chippendale, Australia), the Rubell Famil Collection, (Miami, USA), the Musée d'Art Contemporain de Lyon (Lyon, France), the K11 (Shanghai) Collection, the DSL Collection, among others.

MadeIn Company

In 2009, Xu Zhen founded ‘MadeIn Company,’ a contemporary art creation corporate that plays off of the phrase "Made in China". In 2013, MadeIn Company launched the brand "Xu Zhen" and led MadeIn to expand into curatorial production, research and publications.

In 2014, MadeIn Company founded MadeIn Gallery, a gallery dedicated to the promotion of international artists with an accent on contemporary culture development and communication. Located in M50 Shanghai contemporary art district, MadeIn Gallery aims to be a platform for creativity in China, giving access to the latest artworks of established artists as well as younger and lesser-known talents. MadeIn Gallery was featured in the China Focus Section of the Armory Show in New York in March 2014. On this occasion, detailed images of the series Under Heaven by Xu Zhen, commissioned artist of the Armory, were featured in all the visual promotional materials.

Selected solo exhibitions
2015
Corporate, Graz Kunsthaus, Graz, Austria
In Light Of 25 Years – One of Us Is On the Wrong Side of History!, Witte de With, Rotterdam, The Netherlands
Xu Zhen Solo Exhibition, Long Museum, Shanghai, China

2014
Xu Zhen-Produced by MadeIn Company: Blissful As Gods, ShanghART Gallery, Shanghai, China
Careful Don’t Get Dirty, Patrick Waldburger Gallery, Brussels, Belgium
Prey, Galerie Nathalie Obadia, Paris, France
Xu Zhen-Produced by MadeIn Company, ShanghART Singapore, Singapore 
Xu Zhen-A MadeIn Company Production, Ullens Center for Contemporary Art, Beijing, China

2013
The Most Important Thing Is Not the Contract, OCT, Shanghai, China
Turbulent, Bund 18 Temporary Space, Shanghai China 
Movement Field – Xu Zhen Solo Exhibition, produced by MadeIn Company, Long March Space, Beijing China
Offsite：MadeIn Company, Vancouver Art Gallery, Vancouver, Canada

2012
Forbidden Castle, Muzeum Montanelli, Prague, Czech Republic
MadeIn Company, Minsheng Art Museum, Shanghai, China
Sleeping Life Away, Galerie Nathalie Obadia, Paris, France 
The Last Few Mosquitos, WHERE? , Vancouver Canada

2011
Action of Consciousness, ShanghART Gallery & H Space, Shanghai 
Physique of Consciousness, Long March Space, Beijing 
Physique of Consciousness, Kunsthalle Bern, Bern, Switzerland 
	
2010
Don’t Hang Your Faith on The Wall, Long March Space, Beijing 
Seeing One's Own Eyes, IKON Gallery, Birmingham, UK 
There are new species! What do you suppose they are called? , Fabien Fryns Fine Art, Los Angeles, U.S. 
Spread-by MadeIn, ShanghART Beijing, Beijing, China

2009
Spread—New Exhibition Produced by MadeIn, ShanghART at Huaihai Rd 796, Shanghai, China 
MadeIn -- Seeing One's Own Eyes europalia.china, S.M.A.K., Gent, Belgium
Lonely Miracle: Middle East Contemporary Art Exhibition, James Cohan Gallery, New York, USA 
Seeing One's Own Eyes—Middle East Contemporary Art Exhibition-Space, ShanghART Gallery and ShanghART H-Space, Shanghai 
The Last Few Mosquitos, Ikon Gallery, Birmingham, UK

2008
Impossible is Nothing, Long March Space, Beijing, China
Xu Zhen, Folkert de Jong, Martha Colburn, James Cohan Gallery, New York
Just Did It, James Cohan Gallery, New York

2007
In Just the Blink of an Eye, James Cohan Gallery with PERFORMA, New York
Art '38 Basel, Art Unlimited-Xu Zhen 18 Days (at B3), Art Fair Switzerland

2006
8848 – 1.86, ShanghART H-Space, Shanghai
8848 – 1.86, Museum Boijmans Van Beuningen, Rotterdam, The Netherlands
An Animal, 2577 Longhua Road, Xuhui district, Shanghai

2002
Careful, Don't Get Dirty, Galerie Waldburger, Berlin, Germany
A Young Man, Bizart, Shanghai

References

External links
 MadeIn Company website
 MadeIn Gallery website
 Art-Ba-Ba contemporary art forum
ShanghART Gallery Gallery page of the artist
James Cohan Gallery Works, biography, video clips, articles and reviews.
 Parkett magazine Vol.96 about Xu Zhen 
 MoMA Interviews 2014
Performa 2007 Live performance, In Just a Blink of Eye
Tate Collection Mixed-media installation, 8848 - 1.86
Xu Zhen at 88MoCCA: The Museum of Chinese Contemporary Art on the Web

Living people
Artists from Shanghai
1977 births
Chinese contemporary artists
Chinese performance artists